Cirrocumulus lacunosus also known as Cirrocumulus lacunar or Cirrocumulus lacunaris  is a type of cirrocumulus cloud. The term lacunosus is from Latin, meaning "full of hollows". Cirrocumulus lacunosus is a relatively rare cloud form that occurs as a layer of cloud with circular holes in it. Formation is commonly attributed to a cool layer mixing with a warmer, higher layer of the atmosphere. These holes normally have frayed edges, and they are often arranged in a manner that resembles a net or a honeycomb.

See also
List of cloud types

References

External links
International Cloud Atlas – Cirrocumulus lacunosus

Cirrus
Cumulus